A tween is a child in the stage of preadolescence, between early childhood and early adolescence.

Tween may also refer to:
 Tween (Dungeons & Dragons), a creature in the Dungeon & Dragons series
 Tween (software), a Twitter client for Microsoft Windows
 Tween Brands, a store brand targeting the preteen market owned by Ascena Retail Group
 Tween, a sequence of frames in inbetweening animation that gives the appearance of motion
 Tween, an album by Wye Oak
Brand name of several laboratory detergents:
Tween 20
Tween 40
Tween 60
Tween 80

See also
Teen (disambiguation)
Tweener (disambiguation)
Tweenies, a British children's TV programme 
Tweeny
Between (disambiguation)